Marcial Di Fonzo Bo (born 19 December 1968) is an Argentine actor and theatre director. He appeared in more than twenty films since 1997. Di Fonzo Bo directed several plays in France and was nominated for the Molière Award for Best Director in 2011.

He is the nephew of Facundo Bo, husband of Peter Adam.

Filmography

References

External links 

1968 births
Living people
Argentine male film actors
Argentine theatre directors